The 1982–83 Montreal Canadiens season was the team's 74th season. The season involved being eliminated in the Adams Division semi-finals vs the Buffalo Sabres 3 games to 0.

Offseason

Regular season

Final standings

Schedule and results

Playoffs

Player statistics

Regular season
Scoring

Goaltending

Playoffs
Scoring

Goaltending

Awards and records

Transactions

Draft picks

Farm teams

See also
 1982–83 NHL season

References

Montreal Canadiens seasons
Montreal Canadiens season, 1982-83
Montreal
Montreal Canadiens
Montreal Canadiens